The Central District of Marvast County is in Yazd province, Iran. At the National Census in 2006, the region's population was 12,773 in 3,374 households, when it was Marvast District in Khatam County. The following census in 2011 counted 13,948 people in 3,823 households. At the latest census in 2016, there were 15,150 inhabitants in 4,518 households. After the census, Marvast District was upgraded to county status and split into the Central District and Isar District.

References 

Districts of Yazd Province

Populated places in Yazd Province

fa:بخش مرکزی شهرستان مروست